Curaçao, as well as the rest of the ABC islands and Trinidad and Tobago, lies on the continental shelf of South America. It is a thin island with a generally hilly topography; the highest point is Christoffelberg  in the northwest. The coastline's bays, inlets and hot springs offer a source of natural minerals, thermal conditions, and seawater used in hydrotherapy and mesotherapy, making the island one of many balneoclimateric areas in the region. Off the southeast coast lies the small, flat island of Klein Curaçao.

Flora 
Curaçao's flora differ from typical tropical island vegetation. Guajira-Barranquilla xeric scrub is the most notable, with various forms of cacti, thorny shrubs, evergreen, and watapana trees (Libidibia coriaria; called divi-divi on Aruba), which are characteristic of the ABC islands and the national symbol of Aruba. Brassavola nodosa is a drought-tolerant species of Brassavola, one of the few orchids present in the ABC islands. Cacti include Melocactus and Opuntia species such as Opuntia stricta.

Fauna 

Curaçao is semi-arid, and as such has not supported the numerous tropical species of mammals, birds, and lizards most associated with rainforests. Dozens of species of hummingbirds, bananaquits, orioles, and the larger terns, herons, egrets, and even flamingos make their homes near ponds or in coastal areas. The trupial, a black bird with a bright orange underbelly and white swatches on its wings, is common to Curaçao. The mockingbird, called chuchubi in Papiamentu, resembles the North American mockingbird, with a long white-grey tail and a grey back. Near shorelines, big-billed brown pelicans feed on fish. Other seabirds include several types of gulls and large cormorants.

Other than field mice, small rabbits, and cave bats, Curaçao's most notable animal is the white-tailed deer. This deer is related to the American white-tailed deer, or Virginia deer, found in areas from North America through Central America and the Caribbean, and as far south as Bolivia. It has a long tail with a white underside, and is the only type of deer on the island. It has been a protected species since 1926, and an estimated 200 live on Curaçao. They're found in many parts of the island, but most notably at the west end's Christoffel Park, where about 70% of the herd resides. Archaeologists believe the deer were brought from South America to Curaçao by its original inhabitants, the Arawaks.

There are several species of iguana, light green in colour with shimmering shades of aqua along the belly and sides, found lounging in the sun across the island. The iguanas found on Curaçao serve not only as a scenic attraction but, unlike many islands that gave up the practice years ago, remain hunted for food. Along the west end of the island's north shore are several inlets that have become home to breeding sea turtles. These turtles are protected by the park system in Shete Boka Park, and can be visited accompanied by park rangers.

Climate 
Curaçao has a hot, semi-arid climate (Köppen climate classification BSh) with a dry season from January to September and a wet season from October to December. Rainfall is scarce, only 450 millimeters (18 inches) per year; in particular, the rainy season is drier than it normally is in tropical climates; during the dry season, it almost never rains. Owing to the scarcity of rainfall, the landscape of Curaçao is arid; especially on the north coast of the island. Temperatures are relatively constant, with small differences measured throughout the year. The trade winds cool the island during the day and warm it at night.

Because Curaçao lies North of the Intertropical Convergence Zone and in an area of low-level divergence where winds flow parallel to the coast, its climate is much drier than expected for the northeastern side of a continent at its latitude. Rainfall is also extremely variable from year to year, being strongly linked to the El Niño Southern Oscillation.

Curaçao lies outside the Atlantic's Hurricane Alley but is still occasionally affected by hurricanes, as with Hurricane Hazel in 1954, Anna in 1961, Felix in 2007, and Omar in 2008. Hurricane Hazel caused flash flooding in Curaçao, destroying a bridge and several water dams. It resulted in losses of $350,000 (1954 USD). No hurricane has made landfall in Curaçao since the US National Hurricane Center started tracking hurricanes. Curaçao has, however, been directly affected by pre-hurricane tropical storms several times; the latest being Hurricane Tomas in 2010, Cesar in 1996, Joan in 1988, Cora and Greta in 1978, Edith and Irene in 1971, and Francelia in 1969. This made Tomas one of the wettest events in the island's history, as well as one of the most devastating; its flooding killed two people and caused over NAƒ50 million (US$28 million) in damage.

According to the Emissions Database for Global Atmospheric Research, average carbon dioxide emissions per person on the island were 52 tonnes in 2018, the second highest in the world.

 Climate change 
Average temperatures have risen sharply in the past 40 years in the Caribbean Netherlands and Curaçao has experienced more warm days and fewer cooler nights. The Intergovernmental Panel on Climate Change predicts that should air temperatures increase by 1.4 degrees, there will be a 5% to 6% decrease in rainfall, increased frequency and intensity of extreme weather events (including a 66% increase in hurricane intensity), and a 0.5- to 0.6-meter sea-level rise in the Caribbean Netherlands.

Geology 
The northern seabed drops steeply within  of the Curaçaoan shore. This drop-off is known as the "blue edge".

On Curaçao, four major geological formations can be found: the lava formation, the Knip formation, the Mid-Curaçao formation and limestone formations.

Curaçao lies within the Caribbean large igneous province (CLIP) with key exposures of those lavas existing on the island consisting of the Curaçao Lava Formation (CLF). The CLF consists of 5 km of pillow lavas with some basalt intrusions. The ages of these rocks include 89 Ma for the lavas and 75 Ma for the poikilitic sills, though some sequences may have erupted as late as 62–66 Ma, placing them in the Cretaceous period. Their composition includes picrite pillows at the base, followed by tholeiitic lavas, then hyaloclastites, then the poikilitic sills. The CLF was gradually uplifted until Eocene-Miocene limestone caps formed, before final exposure above sea level. Christoffelberg and the Zevenbergen (Seven Hills) portion of the island have exposures of the Knip Formation. This formation includes deepwater deposits of calcareous sands and fine clays, capped by siliceous chert containing radiolarians. Middle Curaçao contains alluvial soils from eroded CLF and limestone.

Beaches 

Curaçao has a large number of beaches. Most are on the south side of the island. The best known are:

 Baya Beach
 Blue Bay
 Boca Sami
 Daaibooi
 Grote Knip (Kenepa Grandi)
 Kleine Knip (Kenepa Chiki)
 Kokomo Beach
 Mambo Beach
 Piscaderabaai
 Playa Forti
 Playa Jeremi
 Playa Kas Abao
 Playa Kalki
 Playa Kanoa
 Playa Lagun
 Playa Porto Marie
 Playa Santa Cruz
 Playa Santa Barbara
 Seaquarium Beach
 Sint Michielsbaai
 Vaersenbaai 
 Westpunt

Curaçao has a total of 37 beaches.

See also 
 Geography of Aruba
 Geography of Bonaire

References